Sayeed Quadri is an Indian lyricist and poet who works in Bollywood. He was born in Jodhpur, Rajasthan. He won the Best Lyricist award at the 6th IIFA Awards for Murder, and Standout Performance by Lyricist at the Stardust Awards 2005 for Murder.

Awards

Filmography

References

External links

Sayeed Quadri: A profile

Indian lyricists
People from Jodhpur
Living people
Indian Muslims
Place of birth missing (living people)
1965 births